Massilia varians is a Gram-negative rod-shaped bacterium from the genus Massilia and family Oxalobacteraceae.

References

External links
Type strain of Massilia varians at BacDive -  the Bacterial Diversity Metadatabase

Burkholderiales
Bacteria described in 2011